Chehra may refer to:

 Chehra (TV series), aired in 2009
 Chehraa, a 2005 film
 Chehra (2013 film), a 2013 film
 Chehra (1946 film), a Bollywood film